General Dixon may refer to:

Bernard Cooke Dixon (1896–1973), British Army major general
Matthew Dixon (British Army officer) (1821–1905), British Army major general
Robert J. Dixon (1920–2003), U.S. Air Force four-star general

See also
General Dickson (disambiguation)